Paul Ham is an Australian author, historian, journalist and publisher, who writes on the 20th century history of war, politics and diplomacy. He lives in Sydney and Paris.

Life and career
Between 1984 and 1998 Ham worked in London as a business and investment journalist – for the Financial Times Group and the Sunday Times (as its investment editor, 1994–1998). In 1992 he co-founded a financial newsletter publishing company, whose titles included 'Governance' and 'The Money Laundering Bulletin', which he sold in 1997. For part of that period Ham also worked part-time, as the editor of 'Amnesty', the magazine of the British headquarters of Amnesty International. On his return to Australia, in 1998, Ham was appointed the Australia correspondent for The London Sunday Times, a post he held for the next 15 years.

Between 2000 and 2003 he wrote his first history, Kokoda – the story of the first land defeat of the Japanese in the Second World War; followed by Vietnam: The Australian War – a history of Australia's 15-year military involvement in Vietnam. Vietnam won the NSW Premier's Prize for Australian history, and was shortlisted for the Prime Minister's Prize for Non-Fiction; both Vietnam and Kokoda were shortlisted for the Walkley Award for Non-Fiction. His next book, Hiroshima Nagasaki: The Real Story of the Atomic Bombings and Their Aftermath, a controversial history of the atomic bomb, was shortlisted for the NSW Premier's Prize for History and published in the United States, Britain and Australia to critical acclaim.

In 2010 Ham co-wrote and presented the documentary, All the Way, produced by November Films in conjunction with the Australian Broadcasting Corporation (ABC), based on his history of the Vietnam War. In 2008 he was involved in the production of a documentary based on Kokoda, produced by Pericles Films, the ABC and Screen Australia. In 2012 Ham set up an electronic publishing business called Hampress, which publishes short ebooks and classic audiobooks.

In 2013 Ham published 1914: The Year the World Ended, in Britain and Australia, which won the Queensland Literary Award for Non-Fiction in 2014. His book Sandakan: The Untold Story of the Sandakan Death Marches, released the previous year, was shortlisted for the Prime Minister's Literary Awards. In 2016-17 he published his most recent books, Passchendaele: Requiem for Doomed Youth and Young Hitler in Australia and Britain. He is a regular contributor to Amazon's Kindle Single platform, having published 1913, The Target Committee and, with the psychotherapist Bernie Brown, Honey, We Forgot the Kids, an examination of the state of families and childcare in the West.  
 
Ham teaches narrative history at Sciences Po in France and has a Master's degree in Economic History from the London School of Economics and Political Science, a Bachelor of Arts (Communications) degree from Charles Sturt University and attended The Scots College, Sydney. In his spare time, Ham organises an annual poetry recital, The Big Fat Poetry Pig-Out, the proceeds of which go to selected charities.

Books
 Kokoda (HarperCollins 2004)
 Vietnam: The Australian War (HarperCollins 2007) 
 Hiroshima Nagasaki: The Real Story of the Atomic Bombings and Their Aftermath (HarperCollins Australia 2011; Random House UK 2012; Thomas Dunne Books 2014)
 Sandakan (Random House 2012)
 
 Yoko's Diary: The life of a young girl in Hiroshima during WWII, as editor (ABC Books, 2013) 
 Passchendaele: Requiem for Doomed Youth (Penguin Random House 2016-17)
 Young Hitler: The Making of the Führer (Penguin Random House 2017)
 1913 (Endeavour Press, Kindle Single)
 The Target Committee (Endeavour Press, Kindle Single)
 Honey, We Forgot the Kids (Hampress, Kindle Single)
 Godless (Random House Australia 2018)

References

1960 births
Living people
Australian journalists